Owtan (also Romanized as Owţān and Ūţān; also known as Sharīfābād-e Ūţān) is a village in Bizaki Rural District, Golbajar District, Chenaran County, Razavi Khorasan Province, Iran. As of the 2006 census, its population was 51 across 12 families.

References 

Populated places in Chenaran County